Rasbora jacobsoni is a species of ray-finned fish in the genus Rasbora. It is endemic to central Sumatra.

References 

Rasboras
Freshwater fish of Sumatra
Fish described in 1916
Taxa named by Lieven Ferdinand de Beaufort
Taxa named by Max Carl Wilhelm Weber